Sellindge Music Festival was a three-day outdoor event that took place in the countryside between Ashford and Folkestone in South Kent. The site for the festival was on Hope Farm.

Although it planned to be a new style of boutique festival - the festival was actually cancelled in 2010 because PayPal would not release the funds from ticket sales leading up to the festival. This resulted in a catastrophic shortage of cashflow. Debtors from the previous years were unhappy with again being asked to provide services up font, so with great heartache, the festival had to go into liquidation.

Starting life initially as a small local 'fair'-like event the festival's biggest year was in 2009, with Supergrass headlining the main stage, alongside a dance tent with Brandon Block, The Hoxton Whores, Micky Slim and several other major headliners.

Live Sound and Lighting was provided by a local company called "Blusounds" and, which has been re-branded since to "RS-Blu". The team, led by Luke Jordan, included Rob Spickett, Chester Boyd, Raphael Hardy, Scott Lauzon, Matthew Warner, Ed Simmonds, Adam Stewart, Charles Vanstone, Andy Forrest, Stuart Roberts and a few more.

http://sellindgemusicfestival.co.uk/

2010

With only a week to go before the Sellindge Music Festival 2010, the event was cancelled and the event website taken offline. The organisers of the festival cited issues with their online payment agent PayPal and stated refunds would be processed in due time. 2010's festival was due to be held 11–13 June 2010.

2010 'claimed' scheduled headliners were The Sugarhill Gang (Friday), Reverend and the Makers (Saturday) and Lee 'Scratch' Perry (Sunday), with support from Goldie Lookin' Chain Soundsystem, The Rumble Strips and Johnny Foreigner.  Other bands on the line-up included The Foxes, Liam Frost, Eliza Carthy, Mean Poppa Lean, Achilles, James Findlay, Los Salvadores. The festival itself didn't get further than a simple flyer and website.

History

Background

The idea for Sellindge Music Festival was conceived in 2003 by Andre Double, who wanted to combine his love of live music with his grandfather's ambition of staging a festival on his family farm. Andre used the backdrop of the Sellindge Steam Special - a family event of over 40 years - to launch a single music marquee in 2005. Playing on bare grass, with a hastily hired PA, over twenty acts performed at the event. The following year saw the marquee move and double in size. By 2007, the music within the Steam Rally had continued to grow, with greater numbers of local bands appearing. A folk tent was added and the team continued to grow. The groundwork had been done and planning for a dedicated music festival was well underway with a passion for a festival for Kent, attracting music lovers of all ages and backgrounds .

2008

2008 saw the launch of the first full-fledged music festival at Sellindge. The event took place over the weekend of 6, 7 and 8 June with around 60 bands performing over three different stages. Performance areas included the main stage, which was headlined by Idlewild and Mark Morriss of The Bluetones, a folk stage and a tent hosted by BBC Kent Introducing. A dance tent also featured DJs arranged by Bournemouth-based Techno promoters DELETE, including LEK, DJ Mossman, Mudie, Marlow and Dubnium. The festival site played host to further entertainment, including a dedicated VW field and fair-ground.

2009

2009 saw the largest Sellindge Festival to date, with headline acts including Supergrass, The Holloways, The Young Knives and Marina and the Diamonds. The Headroc tent represented the dance fraternity at the festival, with a uniquely diverse lineup which included the likes of Brandon Block, Micky Slim, Eddy Temple Morris, Gary Dedman Hoxton Whores as primary headliners. Other local DJs included Mezza Sound System, Dr Boss and Rob Cockerton, Groove Monkey, Matter of Phatt, HCIYH alongside many others and a variety of VJs.

As it stands from the organisers personal debts there have been no future plans for any further Sellindge Music Festivals.

External links
 
 Sellindge Music Festival official website
 
 Sellindge on Myspace
 
 BBC Kent Introducing official website
 
 BBC Kent Introducing on Myspace
 
 NorthSouthDivide

Notes

Music festivals in Kent